Coleophora lineata is a moth of the family Coleophoridae. It is found in Spain and France.

References

lineata
Moths described in 1960
Moths of Europe